Major-General Sir Joseph Michael Palmer, KCVO (17 October 1928 – 21 February 2017) was a senior British Army officer. He was Defence Services Secretary from 1982 to 1985.

Early life
Born on 17 October 1928, Palmer was the son of Lieutenant-Colonel William Robert Palmer, DSO and his wife Joan Audrey Palmer (née Smith). He was educated at Sandroyd School in Wiltshire, where he was head boy in 1937. After Sandroyd, Palmer attended Wellington College at Crowthorne in Berkshire.

Military career
Having attended the Royal Military Academy, Sandhurst, Palmer was commissioned into the 14th/20th King's Hussars as a second lieutenant on 22 December 1948, with seniority from that date. He was given the service number 400011. Promoted to lieutenant on 22 December 1950, he was Adjutant of 14th/20th King's Hussars from 1953 to 1955, and was given the acting rank of captain on appointment. Promoted to captain on 22 December 1954, he served as Adjutant of the Duke of Lancaster's Own Yeomanry from 1956 to 1959.

He attended Staff College, Camberley in 1960 and, having been promoted to major on 22 December 1961, he attended the Joint Services Staff College in 1965. He was promoted to lieutenant colonel on 30 June 1969 and between 1969 and 1972 he was commanding officer of the 14th/20th King's Hussars. He was promoted colonel on 30 June 1973. He went on to be Commander Royal Armoured Corps at Headquarters 1st (British) Corps in 1974 and, having been promoted to brigadier on 31 December 1974, he became Assistant Chief of Staff at Allied Forces Central Europe in 1976. He became Director Royal Armoured Corps on 8 December 1978 and was promoted to major-general on 19 February 1980. He was Defence Services Secretary from 1982 to 1985, when he retired. On 21 March 1985, Palmer was appointed Knight Commander of the Royal Victorian Order (KCVO).

Palmer was appointed Honorary Colonel of his old regiment, the 14th/20th King's Hussars on 15 February 1981.

Personal life 
Palmer and his wife Jilly have three children, Jeremy, Jonathan and Deborah. Palmer is the father-in-law of artist and journalist, Angela Palmer.

He died on 21 February 2017 at the age of 88.

References 

 

1928 births
2017 deaths
British Army generals
Knights Commander of the Royal Victorian Order
14th/20th King's Hussars officers
People educated at Sandroyd School
People educated at Wellington College, Berkshire
Duke of Lancaster's Own Yeomanry officers
20th-century British Army personnel